Mortal Massacre is the first CD release by New York City death metal band Mortician. It consists of their Brutally Mutilated 7" vinyl EP and Mortal Massacre (hence the title) 7" vinyl EP, and live tracks recorded at two separate shows.

Original issuing
Originally, Mortal Massacre was issued August, 1991, as a 7" vinyl EP by Relapse Records. The cover artwork was a photo of actor Angus Scrimm in his role as "The Tall Man" from the Don Coscarelli film Phantasm.

Track listing

Personnel
 Will Rahmer — Bass Guitar and Vocals
 Roger Beaujard — Guitars and Drum Programming
 Recorded at D-D Studios
 Roger Beaujard and Will Rahmer — Producers
 Roger Beaujard and Will Rahmer — Engineers

CD release
After the 7" release went out-of-print, Relapse Records later issued Mortal Massacre as a cd with additional tracks.

Track listing

Personnel
 Will Rahmer — Bass guitar and Vocals
 Roger J. Beaujard — Guitars
 John McEntee — Guitars
 Matt Sicher — Drums

Third issuing
The Mortal Massacre cd has since gone out-of-print. In 2004 Relapse Records re-released the cd as part of a two-for-one package along with the House by the Cemetery cd.

Mortician (band) albums
1993 EPs